Mount Hoskins is a mountain,  high, standing on the west side of Starshot Glacier,  south of Mount Lindley in Antarctica. It was discovered by the British National Antarctic Expedition, 1901–04, and named for Sir Anthony Hoskins, a former Lord of the Admiralty and a member of the expedition Ship Committee.

References

Mountains of Oates Land